Chapter or Chapters may refer to:

Books
 Chapter (books), a main division of a piece of writing or document
 Chapter book, a story book intended for intermediate readers, generally age 7–10
 Chapters (bookstore), Canadian big box bookstore banner

Buildings and divisions
 Chapter (religion), an assembly of members in a religious order
 Chapter house, a building attached to a cathedral or collegiate church
 Chapter house (Navajo Nation), an administrative division on the Navajo Nation
 Chapter (Navajo Nation), the most local form of government on the Navajo Nation
 Chapter Arts Centre, a cultural centre in Cardiff, Wales
 Every fraternity and sorority has a membership, the meeting of which is known as a chapter

Music
 Chapter Music, a record label
Chapters (Cheryl Pepsii Riley album), a 1991 album by Cheryl Pepsii Riley
 Chapters (Amorphis album), a 2003 album by Amorphis
 Chapters (Anekdoten album), a 2009 album by Anekdoten
 Chapters (Forever Changed album), a 2006 album by Forever Changed
 Chapters (Paradox album), a 2015 album by Paradox
 Chapters (Yuna album), a 2016 album by Yuna

Organization
 A local division of within organizations, such as non-profits, trade unions, or fraternities and sororities

Other
 Chapters (film), a 2012 Malayalam drama film

See also
 The Chapters, a band from Dublin
 Capitulum (disambiguation)